Atomaria fuscata is a species of silken fungus beetle in the family Cryptophagidae. It is found in Europe and Northern Asia (excluding China), North America, and Southern Asia.

References

Further reading

 

Cryptophagidae
Articles created by Qbugbot
Beetles described in 1808